Hikmet Tanyu (1918 – 1992) was a Turkish scientist and college professor of philosophy and history of religions who specialized in Jewish religious history.  He studied in  Israel in the 1970s and wrote a book titled Jews and Turks throughout History which examines Jewish history and relations between Jewish and Turkish societies through history. This book is considered as the first serious approach to the Jewish history in Turkey.

Tanyu was also a devoted nationalist in the Republic of Turkey in the 1940s, he was tried in the Racism-Turanism trials. He was acquitted and released after six months in prison. Due to the tortures he had been inflicted on while imprisoned, he filed a lawsuit against the Turkish authorities at the Council of State.

References

20th-century Turkish historians
1918 births
1992 deaths
Pan-Turkists
Turanists
Turkish expatriates in Israel